Birger Forell (September 27, 1893 in Söderhamn, Sweden - July 4, 1958 in Borås, Sweden) was a priest. He supported refugees, deported and prisoners of war during the Second World War and afterwards.

There is a memorial dedicated to him in the Swedish Church in Berlin.  In 1993, a postage stamp was released to commemorate his 100th birthday.

1893 births
1958 deaths
20th-century Swedish Lutheran priests
Commanders Crosses of the Order of Merit of the Federal Republic of Germany